Cameraria serpentinensis is a moth of the family Gracillariidae. It is known from California, United States.

The length of the forewings is 3.2-4.2 mm.

The larvae feed on Quercus douglasii, Quercus dumosa, Quercus durata and Quercus × alvordiana. They mine the leaves of their host plant. The mine is ovoid. The epidermis is opaque, brown. All mines cross the midrib and consume 60%-90% of the leaf surface. The mines are solitary and normally with two folds, but rarely one. These folds are not necessarily parallel to each other. The leaf is bowed up with a sunken area at the middle of leaf.

Etymology
The specific name is derived from the type of soil (i.e., serpentine) on which one of its host occurs.

References

Cameraria (moth)

Leaf miners
Moths of North America
Lepidoptera of the United States
Moths described in 1981
Fauna of California
Taxa named by Paul A. Opler
Taxa named by Donald R. Davis (entomologist)